The 2023 Dallas mayoral election will be held in May 2023. Incumbent mayor Eric Johnson is running for re-election to a second term in office. No other candidates qualified for the ballot, so Johnson is running unopposed.

Candidates

Declared 
 Eric Johnson, incumbent mayor

Disqualified 
 Jrmar Jefferson, investor and perennial candidate (running as a write-in candidate)
 Kendal Richardson, nonprofit CEO

Declined 
 Mike Ablon, real estate developer and candidate for mayor in 2019
 Michael Hinojosa, former Dallas Independent School District Superintendent

Endorsements

Polling

Results

Notes

References

External links 
Official campaign websites
Eric Johnson for Mayor
Kendal Richardson for Mayor

Dallas mayoral
Dallas
2023
Non-partisan elections
2020s in Dallas